Charles ("Charlie") Francis Vachris (February 19, 1939 – October 7, 2014) was an American civil engineer and politician, and was the founder and head of Vachris Engineering, PC.

Life and career

Early life and education 
Vachris was born in Brooklyn, New York on February 19, 1939. 

For high school, Vachris attended Chaminade High School in Mineola, New York, which he graduated from in 1957. It was there where he met his wife, Evelyn Gaye Vachris (born Kruetzer). In high school, Vachris played on his school's football team.

For college, he attended Yale University's honors college as an engineering major and graduated in 1961; Vachris also played on the school's basketball team. For his masters, Vachris went to Columbia University and earned his masters in Engineering in 1968.

Military service 
Vachris served in the Army Corps of Engineers and was stationed at Fort Knox. He was honorably discharged from the military as a Captain.

Career

Vachris Engineering 
Vachris founded and headed Garden City-based Vachris Engineering, PC in 1982. Before founding the firm, he had worked in a construction company owned by his family.

In 2014, Vachris voluntarily donated personal and corporate services for the engineering of a new basketball court at the Flower Hill Village Park.

Political career 
As a resident of the village of Flower Hill, New York, Vachris served as a Village Trustee from 1988–1990, and also served on its Planning Board and Ethics Board until his passing. 

Vachris also served as Flower Hill's Village Engineer for many years.

Death and legacy 
Vachris died of a heart attack at the age of 75 on October 7, 2014 while playing basketball at the Munsey Park Elementary School in Munsey Park, New York.

The basketball court at the Flower Hill Village Park is dedicated to Vachris.

Personal life 
At the time of his death, Vachris had lived in Flower Hill for roughly 45 years. He and his wife, Evelyn, had 5 children and 11 grandchildren. At the time of his death, Vachris resided at the family's home at 42 Dogwood Lane in Flower Hill.

Vachris was an avid fan and player of basketball, and would play the game until his death.

References 

Flower Hill, New York
American engineers
People from Brooklyn
Chaminade High School alumni
Yale University alumni
Columbia School of Engineering and Applied Science alumni
1939 births
2014 deaths